Kanguiyeh (also Romanized as Kangū’īyeh; also known as Kankū’īyeh and Kenu) is a village in Ravar Rural District, in the Central District of Ravar County, Kerman Province, Iran. At the 2006 census, its population was 11, in 5 families.

References 

Populated places in Ravar County